Stenorhachis is an extinct genus from a well-known class of fossil marine arthropods, the trilobites. It lived during the Arenig stage of the Ordovician Period, approximately 478 to 471 million years ago.

References

Asaphida genera
Asaphidae
Ordovician trilobites
Ordovician trilobites of North America